The first USS Chanticleer (SP-663) was a United States Navy patrol vessel in commission from 1917 to 1918.

Chanticleer was built as a private motorboat by Wilton C. Crosby. On 21 May 1917, the U.S. Navy acquired her from her owner, H.S. Hutchinson of New Bedford, Massachusetts, for use as a section patrol boat during World War I. She was commissioned on 22 May 1917 as USS Chanticleer (SP-663).

Assigned to the 2nd Naval District in southern New England, Chanticleer carried out patrol duties in for the rest of World War I.

Chanticleer was returned to Hutchinson on 25 November 1918.

References

Department of the Navy Naval History and Heritage Command Online Library of Selected Images: U.S. Navy Ships: USS Chanticleer (SP-663), 1917–1918. Previously the civilian motor boat Chanticleer.
NavSource Online: Section Patrol Craft Photo Archive Chanticleer (SP 663)

Patrol vessels of the United States Navy
World War I patrol vessels of the United States
1917 ships